Arjan Kumar Sikri (born 7 March 1954) is an eminent jurist and a former judge of the Supreme Court of India. He was sworn in as a Supreme Court judge on 12 April 2013. Earlier, he had served as the Chief Justice of the Punjab and Haryana High Court. He retired as senior most puisne judge of Supreme Court of India on 6 March 2019.
Presently, he is an International Judge, at the Singapore International Commercial Court,
[SICC] Singapore Supreme Court, he was sworn in to the post on 2 August 2019, by the President of Singapore.
He is also the Chairperson of News Broadcasting Standards Authority

Early life and education
He completed his B.Com. (Hons.) from Shri Ram College of Commerce, Delhi in 1974. He completed his LL.B. from Faculty of Law, University of Delhi in 1977 and won the gold medal. He also completed his LLM from the Faculty of Law, University of Delhi.

Career

As a lawyer
Sikri was enrolled as an advocate in 1977 and he started practising in Delhi. He had specialization in Constitutional cases, Labour - Service Matters and Arbitration matters. He was counsel for numerous Public Sector Undertakings, Educational Institutions, Banks & Financial Institutions and various Private Sector Corporations. He was also a part-time lecturer in Campus Law Centre, Delhi University during 1984-89. 
He was vice-President, Delhi High Court Bar Association during 1994-95. He was designated as a Senior Advocate by Delhi High Court in 1997.

As a judge
Sikri was appointed Judge of the High Court of Delhi  in July, 1999 and has also served as the Acting Chief Justice of Delhi High Court from 10 October 2011 before being elevated as the Chief Justice of Punjab and Haryana High Court in September 2012. in 2013 he was elevated to the Supreme Court of India.

Other positions
  Member, General Body and Academic Council of National Judicial Academy (India)
 Patron-in-Chief, Delhi Judicial Academy.
 Member of the committee on Restatement of Law by the Chief Justice of India.
 Patron-in-Chief and Executive Chairman, Delhi Legal Services Authority.
 Secretary, International Law Association (Indian Branch)
 Member, Governing Council of the Indian Law Institute
 Chancellor of the National Law University, Delhi (past).

Notable Judgments
 In 2013, a Punjab and Haryana High Court Bench consisting of chief justice A. K. Sikri and justice Jain had upheld the appointment of Punjab director general of police Sumedh Singh Saini who was chargesheeted in a criminal case by a CBI court in Delhi holding that he was "legally competent" to hold his present position.
 A division bench of the Punjab and Haryana High Court headed by Chief Justice Sikri had issued notice to Ministry of External Affairs of India taking cognizance of a Public Interest Litigation application seeking release of two prisoners from Punjab, languishing in Pakistan jails even after completion of their sentence. 
 A division bench of the Punjab and Haryana High Court headed by Chief Justice Sikri had issued directions to the states of Punjab and Haryana and Chandigarh administration on what remedial measures to take to curb the menace of crime against women. Earlier he had also noted that Judges have to be sensitized about securing speedy justice in cases related to crime against women, elders, children and discrimination against HIV-infected persons.
 In 2011, as acting Chief Justice of Delhi High Court, he treated a letter addressed to him by a lawyer as suo moto Public Interest Litigation [Writ Petition (Civil) 8889 of 2011]. Letter highlighted the illegal practice of falsification of age of children resulting in their treatment as adult criminals and subsequent incarceration as adults in jails. He issued comprehensive guidelines for various agencies aimed at elimination of incarceration of children as adults in jail. It was in this judgment that he introduced "Age Memo" as a legal tool to document and record age investigation by police.

References

1954 births
Living people
Justices of the Supreme Court of India
Judges of the Delhi High Court
Faculty of Law, University of Delhi alumni
Senior Advocates in India
Place of birth missing (living people)
Chief Justices of the Punjab and Haryana High Court
20th-century Indian judges
21st-century Indian judges